Albert Leffingwell may refer to:
 Albert Leffingwell (physician)
 Albert Leffingwell (novelist)